The men's 400 metres sprint event at the 1936 Olympic Games took place in early August. Forty-two athletes from 25 nations competed. The maximum number of athletes per nation had been set at 3 since the 1930 Olympic Congress. The final was won by American Archie Williams, the third consecutive and seventh overall title in the event for the United States. Godfrey Brown's silver was Great Britain's first medal in the event since 1924.

Background

This was the tenth appearance of the event, which is one of 12 athletics events to have been held at every Summer Olympics. None of the finalists from 1932 returned. Archie Williams of the United States was the favorite, setting the world record at 46.1 seconds at the 1936 NCAA championships.

The Republic of China and Romania appeared in the event for the first time. The United States made its tenth appearance in the event, the only nation to compete in it at every Olympic Games to that point.

Competition format

The competition retained the basic four-round format from 1920. There were 8 heats in the first round, each with 5 or 6 athletes. The top three runners in each heat advanced to the quarterfinals. There were 4 quarterfinals of 6 runners each; the top three athletes in each quarterfinal heat advanced to the semifinals. The semifinals featured 2 heats of 6 runners each. The top two runners in each semifinal heat advanced, making a six-man final.

Records

These were the standing world and Olympic records (in seconds) prior to the 1924 Summer Olympics.

No records were set during this event.

Schedule

Results

Heats

The fastest three runners in each of the eight heats advanced to the quarterfinal round.

Heat 1

Heat 2

Heat 3

Heat 4

Heat 5

Heat 6

Heat 7

Heat 8

Quarterfinals

The fastest three runners in each of the four heats advanced to the semifinal round.

Quarterfinal 1

Quarterfinal 2

Quarterfinal 3

Quarterfinal 4

Semifinals

The fastest three runners in each of the two heats advanced to the final round.

Semifinal 1

Semifinal 2

Final

References

Athletics at the 1936 Summer Olympics
400 metres at the Olympics
Men's events at the 1936 Summer Olympics